KICY is a commercial radio station airing Southern Gospel music and other Christian religious programming in Nome, Alaska, broadcasting on 850 kHz AM.
From the 11:00 PM to 4:00 AM critical hours the station transmits with a three-tower directional array located slightly east of Nome, and pointing due west into Siberia, Russia and airs Russian language programming.

KICY started broadcasting in 1960.

References

External links
AM 850's Website

Nome, Alaska
Moody Radio affiliate stations
Southern Gospel radio stations in the United States
ICY
1960 establishments in Alaska
Radio stations established in 1960